Roger Martival (died 14 March 1330) was a medieval Bishop of Salisbury in England.

Martival was Archdeacon of Huntingdon (1286–1295), Archdeacon of Leicester (1295–1310) and Dean of Lincoln (1310–1315). From 1293 to 1294, he was Chancellor of the University of Oxford.

Martival was elected as Bishop of Salisbury about 11 June 1315 and consecrated on 28 September 1315. He died 14 March 1330. He has a house named for him at Bishop Wordsworth's School, Salisbury.

Citations

References
 

1330 deaths
Archdeacons of Huntingdon
Archdeacons of Leicester
Chancellors of the University of Oxford
Deans of Lincoln
Bishops of Salisbury
14th-century English Roman Catholic bishops
Year of birth unknown